Aphrodisium is a genus of round-necked longhorn beetles of the subfamily Cerambycinae.

Species
 Aphrodisium alabardae Ritsema, 1888 
 Aphrodisium attenuatum Gressitt 
 Aphrodisium basifemoralis (Pic, 1902) 
 Aphrodisium cantori (Hope, 1840) 
 Aphrodisium convexicolle Gressitt & Rondon, 1970 
 Aphrodisium cribricolle Van der Poll, 1890 
 Aphrodisium delatouchii Fairmaire, 1886 
 Aphrodisium distinctipes (Pic, 1904) 
 Aphrodisium faldermannii (Saunders, 1853) 
 Aphrodisium gregoryi (Podaný, 1971) 
 Aphrodisium griffithi (Hope, 1840) 
 Aphrodisium hardwickianum (White, 1853) 
 Aphrodisium inexpectatum Podaný, 1971 
 Aphrodisium luzonicum Schultze, 1920 
 Aphrodisium metallicollis (Gressitt, 1939) 
 Aphrodisium muelleri Tippmann, 1955 
 Aphrodisium neoxenum (White, 1853) 
 Aphrodisium niisatoi Vives & Bentanachs, 2007 
 Aphrodisium ohkurai Hayashi, 1992 
 Aphrodisium panayarum Schultze, 1920 
 Aphrodisium planicolle Van der Poll, 1890 
 Aphrodisium robustum (Bates, 1879) 
 Aphrodisium rufiventre (Gressitt, 1940) 
 Aphrodisium sauteri (Matsushita, 1933) 
 Aphrodisium saxosicolle Fairmaire, 1902 
 Aphrodisium schwarzeri Podaný, 1971 
 Aphrodisium semiignitum (Chevrolat, 1841) 
 Aphrodisium semipurpureum Pic, 1925 
 Aphrodisium strandi Plavilstshikov, 1932 
 Aphrodisium thibetanum Pic, 1925 
 Aphrodisium tonkineum Pic, 1925 
 Aphrodisium tricoloripes Pic, 1925 
 Aphrodisium vermiculosum Gressitt, 1942 
 Aphrodisium viridescens Hayashi, 1974 
 Aphrodisium viridiaeneum Hayashi, 1992 
 Aphrodisium yugaii Kano, 1933

References
 Biolib

Callichromatini